The 2022–23 SuperLiga is the 105th season of the SuperLiga, the top professional league for Romanian association football clubs. The season started on 16 July 2022 and will end in May 2023. It is the seventh season to take place since the play-off/play-out format has been introduced, and CFR Cluj is the five-time consecutive defending champion club.

After the conclusion of the regular season, teams will be divided according to their place to enter either the championship play-offs or the relegation play-outs.

The teams ranked 15th and 16th at the end of the play-out tournament will be directly relegated, while the 13th and 14th places played a promotion/relegation play-off against 3rd and 4th places from Liga II.

Teams 
The league consisted of 16 teams: 12 from the 2021–22 Liga I, two teams from the 2021–22 Liga II, and the winners of the 2021–22 promotion/relegation play-off.

Teams promoted to the Superliga

The first club to be promoted was Petrolul Ploiești, following their 2–0 win against Concordia Chiajna on 9 May 2022. Petrolul Ploiești returned to the Superliga after six years of absence.

The second club to be promoted was Hermannstadt, following their 0–0 draw against CSA Steaua București on 15 May 2022. Hermannstadt returned to Liga I after only one year of absence.

The third club to be promoted was Universitatea Cluj, following their 1–1 draw against Dinamo București on 29 May 2022, in the promotion/relegation play-offs. Universitatea Cluj returned to Liga I after seven years of absence.

Teams relegated to the Liga II

The first club to be relegated was Gaz Metan Mediaș, which were relegated on 2 April 2022 following a 0–4 defeat against UTA Arad, ending their six-year stay in the top flight. Gaz Metan had severe financial problems and was repeatedly penalized, finally ending the season only with financial support from the Romanian Football Federation and the Romanian Professional Football League.

The second club to be relegated was Academica Clinceni, which were relegated on 8 April 2022 following their 0–3 defeat against Chindia Târgoviște, ending their three-year stay in the top flight. Academica had also severe financial problems and was repeatedly penalized, also being denied a license for the new season since March 2022.

The third club to be relegated was Dinamo București, which were relegated on 29 May 2022 following their 1–1 draw against Universitatea Cluj in the promotion/relegation play-offs, thus ending their 74-year stay in the top flight. Dinamo is the second most titled club in Romania and relegated for the first time in their history.

Venues

Personnel and kits 

Note: Flags indicate national team as has been defined under FIFA eligibility rules. Players and Managers may hold more than one non-FIFA nationality.

Managerial changes

Regular season 
In the regular season the 16 teams will meet twice for a total of 30 matches per team, with the top 6 advancing to the Championship play-offs and the bottom 10 qualifying for the relegation play-outs.

Table

Results

Positions by round

Play-off round 
The top six teams from Regular season will meet twice (10 matches per team) for places in 2023–24 UEFA Champions League and 2023–24 UEFA Europa Conference League as well as deciding the league champion. Teams start the Championship round with their points from the Regular season halved, rounded upwards, and no other records carried over from the Regular season.

Play-off table

Play-out round 
The bottom ten teams from the regular season meet once to contest against relegation. Teams started the play-out round with their points from the Regular season halved, rounded upwards, and no other records carried over from the Regular season. The winner of the Relegation round finish 7th in the overall season standings, the second placed team – 8th, and so on, with the last placed team in the Relegation round being 16th.

Play-out table

European play-offs 
In the semi-final, the 7th and 8th-placed teams of the Liga I typically play a one-legged match on the ground of the better placed team (7th place). In the final, the winner of the play-out semi-final will play the highest ranked team of the play-off tournament, that did not already qualify for European competitions. The winner of the final will enter the second qualifying round of the 2023–24 UEFA Europa Conference League.

Promotion/relegation play-offs 
The 13th and 14th-placed teams of the Liga I faces the 3rd and 4th-placed team of the Liga II.

Season statistics

Top scorers

Hat-tricks

Top assists

Clean sheets

Gazeta Sporturilor Monthly Football Awards

Player of the Month

Manager of the Month

Discipline

Champion squad

Awards

References 

Liga I seasons
2022–23 in Romanian football
2022–23 in European association football leagues
Romania